Tilburg Ten Miles is an annual road running competition held in Tilburg, Netherlands since 1988. Since 2002 the competition has been held early September, previous editions were held in late May or early June. Since 2009, the race program has featured a 10K race for men, in addition to the primary 10-miler.

Winners 
Key:

10-mile race

10KM race
Key:

References

External links 
Tilburg Ten Miles

Athletics competitions in the Netherlands
10-mile runs
10K runs
Sports competitions in Tilburg
Recurring sporting events established in 1988